Takayuki Seto (Seto Takayuki; born 5 February 1986) is a Japanese professional footballer who plays as a defensive midfielder for Liga I club Petrolul Ploiești.

Career
Born in Japan, Seto trained between 2004 and 2005  with Brazilian teams Avaí, Corinthians and Portuguesa-RJ in order to improve his footballing skills. He also played indoor football in his country of birth.

Seto started out as a senior in 2007 with Romanian third division club Astra Ploiești; he spent most of his career at that side, which later relocated to Giurgiu. Seto totalled 26 goals from 274 games in the top flight and won four major honours with Astra, including the 2015–16 Liga I. He also had brief stints with clubs in Turkey, Japan and Latvia, as well as with rivals Petrolul Ploiești, respectively.

Career statistics

Club

Honours
Astra Giurgiu
 Liga I: 2015-16
 Cupa României: 2013–14
 Supercupa României: 2014, 2016
 Liga III: 2007–08

RFS
 Latvian Football Cup: 2019

Petrolul Ploiești
Liga II: 2021–22

Individual
 Liga II Team of the Year (Defensive Midfielders): 2008–09
 Liga I Team of the Year (Defensive Midfielders) third place: 2012–13

Records
 Foreign player with the most appearances in Liga I: 301

References
Notes

Citations

External links
Personal blog 

1986 births
Living people
Sportspeople from Nagoya
Japanese footballers
Association football midfielders
Liga I players
Liga II players
Liga III players
FC Astra Giurgiu players
Süper Lig players
Ankaraspor footballers
J2 League players
Ventforet Kofu players
Latvian Higher League players
FK RFS players
FC Petrolul Ploiești players
Japanese expatriate footballers
Expatriate footballers in Brazil
Expatriate footballers in Romania
Expatriate footballers in Turkey
Expatriate footballers in Latvia
Japanese expatriate sportspeople in Brazil
Japanese expatriate sportspeople in Romania
Japanese expatriate sportspeople in Turkey
Japanese expatriate sportspeople in Latvia